The 2022 Caldas da Rainha Ladies Open was a professional tennis tournament played on outdoor hard courts. It was the third edition of the tournament which was part of the 2022 ITF Women's World Tennis Tour. It took place in Caldas da Rainha, Portugal between 12 and 18 September 2022.

Champions

Singles

  Lucrezia Stefanini def.  Marina Bassols Ribera, 3–6, 6–1, 7–6(7–3)

Doubles

  Adriana Reami /  Anna Rogers def.  Elysia Bolton /  Jamie Loeb, 6–4, 7–5

Singles main draw entrants

Seeds

 1 Rankings are as of 29 August 2022.

Other entrants
The following players received wildcards into the singles main draw:
  Maria Garcia
  Georgina García Pérez
  Matilde Jorge
  Hiroko Kuwata

The following player received entry into the singles main draw using a protected ranking:
  Emiliana Arango

The following players received entry from the qualifying draw:
  Olga Helmi
  Sakura Hosogi
  Hina Inoue
  Katarina Jokić
  Taylor Ng
  María Portillo Ramírez
  Adriana Reami
  Anna Rogers

The following player received entry as a lucky loser:
  Ana Filipa Santos

References

External links
 2022 Caldas da Rainha Ladies Open at ITFtennis.com
 Official website

2022 ITF Women's World Tennis Tour
2022 in Portuguese sport
September 2022 sports events in Portugal